The I Games of the Small States of Europe were held in 1985 by the Republic of San Marino.

Competitions

Medal table

Final Table:

References

San Marino Olympic Committee 

 
Games of the Small States of Europe
Games of the Small States of Europe
Games of the Small States of Europe
Games Of The Small States Of Europe
Games Of The Small States Of Europe
International sports competitions hosted by San Marino
Multi-sport events in San Marino